Gonocephalum assimile is a species of darkling beetle in the family Tenebrionidae.

Distribution 
This species is present in Italy (incl. Sardinia and Sicily).

References 

 Biolib
 Fauna Europaea
 D. Iwan, J. Ferrer, and M. Ras   CATALOGUE OF THE WORLD GONOCEPHALUM - SOLIER, 1834 (COLEOPTERA, TENEBRIONIDAE, OPATRINI).PART 1. LIST OF THE SPECIES AND SUBSPECIES

Endemic arthropods of Italy
Tenebrioninae
Beetles described in 1848